The men's 100 metre butterfly event at the 1968 Olympic Games took place between 20 and 21 October. This swimming event used the butterfly stroke. Because an Olympic size swimming pool is 50 metres long, this race consisted of two lengths of the pool.

Medalists

Results

Heats
Heat 1

Heat 2

Heat 3

Heat 4

Heat 5

Heat 6

Heat 7

Semifinals

Semifinals 1

Semifinals 2

Semifinals 3

Final

Key: OR = Olympic record

References

Men's butterfly 100 metre
Men's 100 metre butterfly
Men's events at the 1968 Summer Olympics